= Oswego bass =

Oswego bass may refer to:

- Largemouth bass (Micropterus nigricans)
- Crappie (Pomoxis)
